Jardim Planalto is a station of the São Paulo Metro. It belongs to Line 15-Silver, which is currently in expansion, and should go to Cidade Tiradentes, connecting with Line 2-Green in Vila Prudente. It is located in Avenida Sapopemba, 10000.

It was officially opened on 26 August 2019.

Station layout

References

São Paulo Metro stations
Railway stations opened in 2019